Sir Bagby was an American daily strip created by brothers Rick Hackney and Bill Hackney, who signed the strip "R & B Hackney." The setting was a medieval world filled with anachronisms and puns. (In that, it resembled Jack Kent's King Aroo, distributed by the same syndicate.) The strip ran in a small number of US newspapers from 1957 to 1967, as well as in The Canberra Times from 1960 to 1966.

Characters and story 
The main characters are Sir Bagby, a knight, King Filbert I, II ("King Filbert I was my father. He built the business up so I decided to keep the name."), a wizard named Snerk, a jester named Solly, a playwright named Faro, and his assistant, Billingsgate.

Reprints 
The only reprints of the strip have been in Comics Revue.

References

 Strickler, Dave. Syndicated Comic Strips and Artists, 1924-1995: The Complete Index. Cambria, CA: Comics Access, 1995. .

External links
 Sir Bagby at ComicStripFan
 Rick Hackney, Lambiek's Comiclopedia

American comic strips
Comics characters introduced in 1957
Gag-a-day comics
Fictional knights
Comics set in the Middle Ages
1957 comics debuts
1967 comics endings
American comics characters